The  region of Japan, also called the , refers to the areas of eastern Mie Prefecture in or around Ise-Shima National Park, which include the cities Ise, Toba, Shima, and parts of the town of Minami-Ise.  The area thrives on tourism, with many resort hotels and beaches in the area. Ise-Shima is also famed for fresh seafood, particular oysters.

The peninsula extends out into the Pacific Ocean, and unlike the factory-dotted coast of Ise Bay, the main industry is seafood and marine products, particularly pearl cultivation.

Locations
Tourism in the Ise-Shima region is fueled primarily by these locations:
Ise Grand Shrine
The Wedded Rocks
Mikimoto Pearl Island
Toba Aquarium
Shima Spain Village

Access
Direct service is available to Ise-Shima from both Osaka and Nagoya via Kintetsu limited express trains.

In popular culture 
 The author Mayumi Inaba's book  was written about her life on the Shima peninsula.
 , an award-winning 2016 documentary film by Portuguese director Cláudia Varejão, follows the daily life of three Japanese Ama women who have been diving together, for 30 years, in a small fishing village on the Shima peninsula.

External links
 Japan Guide - Shima Peninsula Travel Guide

References 

Peninsulas of Japan
Tourist attractions in Mie Prefecture
Landforms of Mie Prefecture